68 may refer to: 
 68 (number)
 one of the years 68 BC, AD 68, 1968, 2068
 68 Publishers, a Czech-Canadian publishing firm
 '68 (band), an American rock band
 '68 (comic book) a comic book series from Image Comics

See also
List of highways numbered 68